Mohla-Manpur-Ambagarh Chowki district is one of the four new district in the state of Chhattisgarh, India announced by Bhupesh Baghel on 15th August 2021. It is carved out from existing Rajnandgaon district.

Sub Division 
District is sub divided into five tehsils: 

 Ambagarh Chowki
 Manpur
 Mohla
 Aundhi
 Khadgaon

Demographics 

At the time of the 2011 census, Mohla-Manpur district had a population of 283,947. Mohla-Manpur district has a sex ratio of 1027 females to 1000 males. 3.49% of the population lives in urban areas. Scheduled Castes and Scheduled Tribes make up 20,722 (7.30%) and 179,662 (63.27%) of the population respectively.

At the time of the 2011 Census of India, 79.27% of the population in the district spoke Chhattisgarhi, 11.15% Gondi, 5.02% Hindi and 3.26% Marathi as their first language.

References

Districts of Chhattisgarh